The women's long jump event at the 2019 European Athletics U23 Championships was held in Gävle, Sweden, at Gavlehof Stadium Park on 13 and 14 July.

Medalists

Results

Qualification
Qualification rule: 6.40 (Q) or the 12 best results (q) qualified for the final.

Final

References

Long
Long jump at the European Athletics U23 Championships